James A. Young (born November 7, 1955) is an American politician, who was elected mayor of Philadelphia, Mississippi in May 2009. His election was especially noted as he is the first African-American mayor of the city, which was previously best known for the murders of Chaney, Goodman, and Schwerner by members of the Ku Klux Klan in 1964.

Young is a Pentecostal preacher and a former county supervisor who was 53 years old at the time of his election. He defeated Rayburn Waddell, a white, three-term incumbent, by 46 votes in the Democratic primary. As there was no Republican challenger, the winner of the primary automatically became the city's next mayor. He took office on July 3, 2009.

Jim Prince, publisher of the local The Neshoba Democrat newspaper, said: "Philadelphia will always be connected to what happened here in 1964, but the fact that Philadelphia, Mississippi, with its notorious past, could elect a black man as mayor, it might be time to quit picking on Philadelphia, Mississippi."

Young's campaign staff credited Barack Obama's presidential campaign for increasing registration of black and young voters in Philadelphia.

Young and his wife Sheryl have one daughter, Shanda (born 1978).

References

External links
City of Philadelphia, Mississippi

African-American mayors in Mississippi
County supervisors in Mississippi
Living people
Mayors of places in Mississippi
People from Philadelphia, Mississippi
Mississippi Democrats
1955 births
21st-century African-American people
20th-century African-American people